The 2021–22 Houston Cougars men's basketball team represented the University of Houston in the 2021–22 NCAA Division I men's basketball season. The Cougars were led by eighth-year head coach Kelvin Sampson. The team played their home games at the Fertitta Center as members of the American Athletic Conference.

Houston finished its 2021–22 regular season with an overall record of 26–5. They were regular-season champions of the American Conference with a record of 15–3 in conference play. They entered the conference tournament as the #1 seed and proceeded to win the tournament, defeating Memphis 71–53 in the final. The Cougars entered the NCAA tournament as the #5 seed in the South Regional. Houston went 3–1 in the tournament, reaching the Elite Eight before falling 44–50 to Villanova in the regional final.

Houston finished the season with a record of 32–6 and a ranking of #7 in the final Coaches Poll.

Previous season
Houston finished the 2020–21 regular season 21–3, 14–3 in AAC play, finishing in second place for the regular season.  They entered as the No. 2 seed in the AAC tournament, which the Cougars would go on to win for the first time to clinch an auto-bid to the NCAA tournament. They were selected as a #2 seed in the Midwest Region.  The team advanced to the Final Four for the first time since 1984, where they lost to eventual national champions Baylor.

Offseason

Departing players

Incoming Transfers

2021 recruiting class

2022 Recruiting class

Preseason

AAC preseason media poll

On October 13, The American released the preseason Poll and other preseason awards

Preseason Awards
 All-AAC First Team - Marcus Sasser

Roster

December 22, 2021 – Tramon Mark had shoulder surgery, leading him to miss the rest of the season.
December 24, 2021 – Marcus Sasser announced he would miss the rest of the season due to a foot injury.

Schedule and results

|-
!colspan=12 style=| Exhibition 

|-
!colspan=12 style=| Non-conference regular season

|-
!colspan=12 style=| AAC Regular Season

|-
!colspan=12 style=| AAC Tournament

|-
!colspan=12 style=| NCAA tournament

Source

Rankings

*AP does not release post-NCAA Tournament rankings^Coaches did not release a week 1 poll.

Awards and honors

American Athletic Conference honors

All-AAC Awards
Coach of the Year: Kelvin Sampson

All-AAC First Team
Josh Carlton
Fabian White Jr.

All-AAC Second Team
Kyler Edwards

All-AAC Third Team
Jamal Shead

Source

References

Houston
Houston Cougars men's basketball seasons
Houston
Houston
Houston